Aerobic gymnastics or sport aerobics is a competitive sport originating from traditional aerobics in which complex, high-intensity movement patterns and elements of varying difficulty are performed to music.

Nature of the game

The performance area is  square for juniors or  square for adults and for aero dance and step.

In International competition there are 9 different events: Individual Women, Individual Men, Mixed Pairs, Trios, Group (five athletes), Step Dance (both eight athletes) and trapezium pass. The last four are regardless of the genders of the athletes.

The performances are made up of four groups of elements.   The routine must be performed entirely to music.

In the competition, there are specific requirements regarding the outfit, the number of elements performed, the number of lifts performed, the number of elements performed on the floor and much more.

Performances are scored in the following areas:  artistry, execution, difficulty and the chair of the judges panel determines the final score deductions based on deductions that change with each code of points. If the combined scores are the same, the tiebreaker is the team with higher execution scores.

The long-term ultimate goal of the sport of aerobic gymnastics is to be included in the Olympic Games.

Competitive aerobic gymnastics

National Aerobic Championships 
The National Aerobic Championships is a competition of aerobic gymnastics started in 1984 in the United States. Founded by Sport Fitness International, it was the first major championships in the sport predating the Aerobic Gymnastics World Championships by 11 years. From 1988 onwards the individual events were separated into individual men and women, mixed pair and team.  The sport became popular around the world after it gained popularity in the US when major championships were aired on ESPN during the height of the fitness movement in the US. In recent years, the sport has experienced growth in Eastern Europe, China, Argentina, Mexico, Canada and Australia among other countries but has not grown significantly in the US as the creators of the sport in the USA struggled to transition the focus from fitness to gymnastics.  As other countries have blended successfully with their gymnastic federations, the US, where the sport was created, has not been as successful in making that transition.  USA Gymnastics does not officially acknowledge the sport as a gymnastic discipline even though the international governing body, the FIG, does so.

FIG aerobics 
The competitive aerobic gymnastics are governed by the Fédération Internationale de Gymnastique (FIG). The FIG designs the Code of Points and regulates all aspects of international elite competition. Within individual countries, gymnastics is regulated by national federations. In 1995, the FIG recognised sport aerobics as a new competitive gymnastics discipline, organised judges and coaches courses and launched the 1st Aerobic Gymnastics World Championships  in Paris (34 countries). In 1997, the IWGA (International World Games Association) included Aerobic Gymnastics in its programme of the 5th World Games (Lahti, Finland). Since 1999 The European Union of Gymnastics has been conducting Aerobic European Gymnastics Championships in all uneven years. Leading nations who have provided World Medallists are: Australia, Brazil, Bulgaria, Chile, China, France, Hungary, Italy, Japan, Korea, New Zealand, Romania, Russia and Spain.

FISAF aerobics 
The Federation of International Sports, Aerobics and Fitness (FISAF) is an international non-profit "umbrella organization" active in over 40 countries.  It is self-described as "the largest fitness industry organisation in the world" and "the largest instructor certification agency in the world".

In popular culture 
The sport was added in the biannual Idol Star Athletics Championships for Lunar New Year, 2017 as a male team equivalent to the female individual rhythmic gymnastics, and the scores are given in accordance to FIG Standards. Seventeen (9.8 Technical+9.3 Execution-0.0 Penalty) and ASTRO (9.75+9.45-0.1) both scored 19.10 out of 20.00, but since ASTRO scored higher in Execution, ASTRO won the inaugural event.

In the American sketch comedy television series Key & Peele, the duo parodies the '80s video footage of the National Aerobic Championship in a sketch showing the aerobic dancers experience a meltdown while dancing to the championship theme song.

References

External links

The Association of National Aerobics Championships (ANAC)
 http://www.fig-gymnastics.com/site/site/miniSiteNews?id=14712

 
Gymnastics
ja:エアロビクスダンス#エアロビック競技